Sir (John) Edmund (Ritchie) Findlay, 2nd Baronet FRSE (14 June 1902 – 6 September 1962) was a Scottish politician and baronet. He was Member of Parliament (MP) for Banffshire from 1935 to 1945.

Life
 
He was the eldest son of Sir John Ritchie Findlay, 1st Baronet, and Dame Harriet Findlay (DBE) (born Harriet Jane Backhouse). He was educated at Harrow School and then attended university at Balliol College, Oxford, graduating BA.

He married Margaret Jean Graham.

Like his father and grandfather, John Ritchie Findlay, he was proprietor of The Scotsman newspaper.

He succeeded his father to the baronetcy in 1930 and was in turn succeeded by his brother, Lt.-Col. Roland Lewis Findlay.

In 1932, he was elected a Fellow of the Royal Society of Edinburgh. His proposers were James Watt, Robert Grant, Sir Edward Albert Sharpey-Schafer and James Hartley Ashworth.

He was Unionist Member of Parliament (MP) for Banffshire from 1935 to 1945.

In 1953, he sold The Scotsman newspaper to Roy Thomson, 1st Baron Thomson of Fleet, ending the long connection between the Findlay family and the newspaper.

He died on 6 September 1962 in Bermuda in the West Indies.
He is buried on the island in St Marks Church cemetery.

References

External links 
 

1902 births
1962 deaths
People educated at Harrow School
Alumni of Balliol College, Oxford
Findlay, Sir John Edmund Ritchie
Members of the Parliament of the United Kingdom for Scottish constituencies
Unionist Party (Scotland) MPs
Scottish journalists
20th-century Scottish businesspeople
Edmund
UK MPs 1935–1945
British expatriates in Bermuda